Jordan is an area in Hong Kong, located on Kowloon Peninsula. It is named after a road of the same name in the district. The area is bordered by King's Park to the east, Tsim Sha Tsui to the south, Ferry Point to the west, and Yau Ma Tei to the north. Administratively, it is part of Yau Tsim Mong District.

Geography
Jordan is located in the central part of the Yau Tsim Mong District. The western portion is officially known as Kwun Chung, especially before the MTR metro system went into service in 1979.

Jordan is considered as an area surrounded by Cox’s Road to the east, Austin Road to the south, Ferry Street to the west, and Kansu Street to the north.

Like most of southern Kowloon, Jordan is entirely developed and urbanised other than a few small parks. Motor and pedestrian traffic throughout most of the day is very dense.

Character

Jordan is a microcosm of working-class Hong Kong. Like nearby districts of Mong Kok and Tsim Sha Tsui, large sections of Jordan hosts a mix of older residential high-rises, office buildings, street markets, hotels, eateries and an almost infinite variety of small shops. There are also sections offering karaoke, hostess bars and massage parlours, however, nearby Mong Kok is better known for such services.

Although Jordan lacks the sights and comforts to support mass mainstream tourism, it still attracts a small cadre of adventurous tourists interested in experiencing authentic working-class life in Hong Kong. For locals, many live in Jordan for its relatively affordable housing, its centralised location on the spine of Hong Kong's transportation network and its diverse cultural flavour.

Jordan is home to a large number of Indians, Pakistanis, Nepalese and other ethnic minorities. The area bordering Ferry Point therefore hosts a wide array of South Asian and other restaurants and market stores.

History
On 23 January 2021, HKSAR government imposed the first COVID-19 lockdown in Jordan at 04:00. The lockdown area reopened at 03:30 on 25 January, lasting for 23.5 hours.

Tourism and recreation
The following noteworthy places are located in Jordan:

 Australia Dairy Company
 Diocesan Girls' School
 Gun Club Hill Barracks
 Jade Market & Jade Street
 Kowloon Union Church
 Man Wah Sun Chuen
 Temple Street Night Market
 King George V Memorial Park, Kowloon
 Kowloon Cricket Club
 Kowloon Park (North Entrance)

Jordan is also home to a number of prominent hotels in Kowloon:
 Novotel Nathan Road Kowloon Hong Kong
 Eaton Hotel Hong Kong
 Nathan Hotel
 Mayfair Garden Hotel

Major roads and streets 

Austin Road
Battery Street
Bowring Street
Gascoigne Road
Cox’s Road
Jordan Path
Jordan Road
Kansu Street
Kwun Chung Street
Min Street
Nanking Street
Ning Po Street
Pak Hoi Street
Parkes Street, named after Harry Parkes
Pilkem Street
Reclamation Street
Saigon Street
Temple Street
Woosung Street

Transport
Nathan Road and Jordan Road run through the area. The intersection of these two roads is a major intersection in Kowloon.

Jordan is served by the MTR station of the same name, on the Tsuen Wan line, as well as numerous bus lines.

Jordan is also the site of a bus terminal for transport to the Huanggang Border Crossing in Shenzhen, China.

See also
 List of places in Hong Kong
 Austin MTR station
 Jordan MTR station
 King's Park
 Tsim Sha Tsui
 Yau Ma Tei

References

External links

 Map of Jordan 
 MTR Map of Jordan

Places in Hong Kong
Yau Tsim Mong District